Enn Võrk (14 March 1905 Volkovysk, Grodno Governorate – 20 September 1962 Tallinn) was an Estonian composer, conductor, and organist.  

In 1926, he graduated from Tallinn Conservatory.

Between 1926–1933, he conducted Choir of St. John's Church in Tallinn. From 1926–1929, he conducted Radio Broadcasting Symphony Orchestra.

He has been the organist in Tallinn St. John's Church (1926–1933) and Rapla Church (1944–1950, 1955–1962).

Between 1945-1950 and from 1959, he was a member of Estonian Composers' Union.

Works

 choral song "" (Eesti lipp)
 choral song "I Would Take a Flower Chain"
 choral song "The Singer"
 oratorio "Vigilate" (1957)

References

1905 births
1962 deaths
20th-century Estonian composers
Estonian conductors (music)
Estonian organists
Estonian Academy of Music and Theatre alumni
Academic staff of the Estonian Academy of Music and Theatre